Colón is a city and seaport in Panama, beside the Caribbean Sea, lying near the Atlantic entrance to the Panama Canal. It is the capital of Panama's Colón Province and has traditionally been known as Panama's second city. Originally it was located entirely on Manzanillo Island, surrounded by Limon Bay, Manzanillo Bay, and the Folks River; however, since the disestablishment of the Panama Canal Zone, the city's limits have been redefined to include Fort Gulick, a former U.S. Army base, as well the former Panama Canal Zone towns of Cristobal, Margarita, and Coco Solo.

History 
The city was founded by the United States in 1850 as the Atlantic terminal of the Panama Railroad, then under construction to meet the demand during the California Gold Rush for a fast route to California. For a number of years early in its history, the sizable United States émigré community called the town Aspinwall after Panama Railroad promoter William Henry Aspinwall, while the city's Hispanic community called it Colón in honor of Christopher Columbus. The city was founded on the western end of a treacherously marshy islet known as Manzanillo Island. As part of the construction of the Panama Railroad, the island was connected to the Panamanian mainland by a causeway and part of the island was drained to allow the erection of permanent buildings.

Much of the city was destroyed in the Burning of Colón during the Colombian Civil War of 1885 and again during a massive fire in 1915. The Great Colón Fire of April 13–14, 1940 destroyed one-third of the city.

The 1914 boundary treaty made Colón an exclave of the Republic of Panama entirely surrounded by the Panama Canal Zone. During Panamanian nationalist unrest from the 1950s onwards, the U. S. military sometimes established checkpoints along the Colón Corridor, feeding the resentment that had led to the unrest.

Fort De Lesseps
Fort De Lesseps was a small U.S. Army Coast Artillery Corps fort located at the northern tip of the city. It was named after the canal developer Ferdinand de Lesseps.

From 1948 to 1989

In 1948, the southeastern corner of Manzanillo Island was designated as the Colón Free Trade Zone. The Free Trade Zone has since been expanded through land reclamation on the Folks River and annexation of parts of France Field (now Enrique Adolfo Jiménez Airport) and Coco Solo.

Politically instigated riots in the 1960s destroyed the city's municipal palace and signaled the start of the city's decline, which was further accelerated by the military dictatorships of Omar Torrijos and Manuel Noriega from 1968 to 1987.

Since late 2014 

A massive restoration and reconstruction project, involving parks, avenues and historic buildings and monuments, began in late 2014 and uses the hashtags "#RenovaciónColón", "#CiudadDeColón", "#RenovationColon (Renovation of Colón)" and "#CityOfColon". The First Baptist Church of Colón, Panama, is one of the buildings whose renovation has been completed.

Climate 
Like most of the Caribbean coast of Central America, Colón possesses an extremely wet tropical climate owing to the powerful, wet trade winds flowing onto high mountains throughout the year. Unlike most parts of this coast, however, February and March are sufficiently dry that Colón fits into the tropical monsoon climate (Köppen Am) category rather than a tropical rainforest climate (Af) as found in most Caribbean coastal areas.

Population 
Colón's population in 1900 was 3,001. It grew significantly with the building of the Panama Canal, becoming 31,203 by 1920. In 2000, the population was around 204,000.

With the city's economic decline, many of its upper and middle-class residents left, reducing its ethnic diversity. European and American expatriate communities, as well as Panamanians of Greek, Italian, Jewish, Chinese and Indian/South Asian heritage, started moving to Panama City, to former Canal Zone towns, and overseas.

Today, sizable South Asian and Arab communities live in the remaining prosperous areas of the city, as well as in gated communities outside it. The majority of the city's population is of West Indian or mixed mestizo ancestry.

Colón was home to some of the best-educated and most well-heeled Panamanian families of West Indian heritage, such as the Drews, the Fords, the Moodys, the Robinsons, the Beebys, the Archibolds, the Edwards, the Crowns, the Hoys, the Warehams, the Abrahams, and the McKintoshs. From these families sprang the teachers, professors, doctors, lawyers, engineers, businessmen, and politicians that contributed to the city's prosperity. Most of them eventually left the city for the United States or the United Kingdom. Their influence may still be seen, however, in their descendants that remain in the province.

Colón was also home to Las Amigas de la Caridad ("Women of Charity"), a charitable organization of women of Caribbean descent. The organization met largely in the home of Gladys Booth Ford and her stepdaughter Ruby Ford Drew at Calle 7 and Avenida Sta. Isabel. Ruby Drew was a long-standing member of Christ Church by the Sea.

Culture

Literature
The main setting of the novella "Latarnik" ("The Lighthouse Keeper", 1881) by Polish author Henryk Sienkiewicz is the lighthouse in Aspinwall.

Colón is also the setting of Argentine writer César Aira’s short 2002 novel Varamo.

Juan Gabriel Vásquez's The Secret History of Costaguana has many scenes set in late 19C and early 20C Colón.

Georges Simenon's L'Aîné des Ferchaux has Colon as a location in the second part of the novel.

Sports 
Colón is home to Correcaminos Colon, 2016 Basketball Champion of Panama and member of the FIBA Americas League. The team plays its home games at the Arena Teófilo "Panamá" Al Brown.

Transport 
The city is served by the Panama Canal Railway and Enrique Adolfo Jiménez Airport.

People from Colón

Arts, sciences, politics, and military
 Kenneth B. Clark, psychologist, educator, testified in Brown v. Board of Education
 Pedro Heilbron, CEO of Copa Holdings
 Eric Jackson, publisher, journalist and talk show host
 John McCain, American politician, Senator from Arizona from 1986 until his death in 2018, and 2008 Republican presidential nominee, born in the U.S. Navy hospital at the Coco Solo submarine base; the site is now in Colón.
 George E. Pierce, U.S. Navy Rear Admiral and double Navy Cross recipient.
 Juan Williams, political commentator on Fox News
 Billy Cobham, musician, songwriter, bandleader, educator.
Carlos Bieberach, Salsa singer with Orquesta La Inmensidad since 1988. Lives in USA since 1982 and in Miami since 1983.

Athletes
 Rod Carew, Major League Baseball player, inducted in 1991 to the Baseball Hall of Fame, selected to the Major League Baseball All-Century Team
 Rennie Stennett, Major League Baseball second baseman for the 1979 World Series Champion Pittsburgh Pirates.
 Alfonso "Panama" Al Brown, boxer, first Hispanic World Champion, World Bantamweight Champion between 1929 and 1934, induced in 1992 to International Boxing Hall of Fame
 George Headley (1909-1983), West Indies cricketer born in Colón; the only person from Panama to play Test cricket.
 Miguel Iriarte, boxer, fought for the WBA world Bantamweight title in 1982
 Ismael Laguna, boxer, World Featherweight Champion in 1965 and 1970, inducted in 1999 to World Boxing Hall of Fame and in 2001 to International Boxing Hall of Fame
 Jorge Lujan, boxer, WBA and Ring Magazine world Bantamweight champion
 Irving Saladino, athlete, long jump, 2007 World Champion and 2008 Olympic gold medalist, first gold medalist of the nation
 Manny Sanguillén, catcher for the Pittsburgh Pirates
 Julio Dely Valdés, football player
 Celestino Caballero, boxer, WBA Super Bantamweight Champion 2005–present, IBF Super Bantamweight Champion 2008–present
 Ben Oglivie, Major League Baseball player for the Boston Red Sox, Detroit Tigers, and the Milwaukee Brewers
 Gary Forbes, National Basketball Association player, Small Forward for the Houston Rockets.
 Ruben Garces, College and Professional basketball player, Power Forward and center.

See also
 Fort Sherman
 List of former United States military installations in Panama

References

Further reading

External links

 
 Colón City Panama extensive site about Colón, Panama
 Map of Fort De Lesseps

 
1850 establishments in the Republic of New Granada
Colón Province
Populated coastal places in Panama
Populated places established in 1850
Populated places in Colón Province
Port cities in the Caribbean
Port settlements in Central America
Transcontinental cities
Former exclaves